Bootherium (Greek: "ox" (boos), "beast" (therion)) is an extinct bovid genus from the middle to late Pleistocene of North America which contains a single species, Bootherium bombifrons.  Vernacular names for Bootherium include Harlan's muskox, woodox, woodland muskox, helmeted muskox, or bonnet-headed muskox. Bootherium was one of the most widely distributed muskox species in North America during the Pleistocene era. It is most closely related to the modern muskox, from which it diverged around 3 million years ago, it is possibly synonymous with Euceratherium, although this is uncertain.

Taxonomy
Fossils have been documented from as far north as Alaska to California, Utah, Texas, Missouri, Michigan, Oklahoma, Virginia, North Carolina and New Jersey. The species became extinct approximately 11,000 years ago at the end of the last ice age.

 
Symbos was formerly thought to be a separate genus, but is now known to be synonymous. The closest relative of Bootherium is the extant muskox Ovibos moschatus. However, unlike the tundra muskox, Bootherium was physically adapted to a range of less frigid climates and appears to have been the only ox to have evolved in and remain restricted to the North American continent. Bootherium was significantly taller and leaner than muskoxen found today in Arctic regions. Other differences were a thicker skull and considerably longer snout. The horns of Bootherium were situated high on the skull, with a downward curve and were fused along the midline of the skull, unlike tundra muskoxen whose horns are separated by a medial groove.

Three other species of musk oxen co-inhabited North America during the Pleistocene era. Besides the surviving tundra muskox, the extinct shrub-ox (Euceratherium collinum) and Soergel's ox (Soergelia mayfieldi) were also present.

Notes

References

External links

 http://nature.ca/notebooks/english/helmet.htm 
 https://web.archive.org/web/20080407140851/http://www.ansp.org/museum/jefferson/otherFossils/bootherium.php

Prehistoric bovids
Prehistoric mammals of North America
Pleistocene mammals of North America
Pleistocene even-toed ungulates
Pleistocene species extinctions
Taxa named by Joseph Leidy
Fossil taxa described in 1852
Taxa named by Richard Harlan
Prehistoric even-toed ungulate genera